Psychoda is a genus of moth flies in the family Psychodidae. There are more than 400 described species in Psychoda.

See also
 List of Psychoda species

References

Further reading

External links

 

Psychodidae
Articles created by Qbugbot
Psychodomorpha genera
Taxa named by Pierre André Latreille